is a museum in Tokyo, Japan.

The museum opened in Toranomon, Tokyo in 1917 to house the collection of pre-modern Japanese and East-Asian Art amassed since the Meiji Restoration by industrialist Ōkura Kihachirō. The museum collection includes some 2,500 works, among which are three National Treasures and twelve Important Cultural Properties.

The museum is located within the grounds of the Hotel Okura Tokyo. Closed for renovation since April 1, 2014, the museum reopened alongside the rebuilt hotel in 2019.

History
The Okura Museum of Art was the first private museum in Japan. The museum and all the exhibits on display were destroyed in the 1923 Great Kantō earthquake although works then in storage survived. The exhibition hall was rebuilt in 1927 by leading architect and architectural historian Itō Chūta and is a Registered Cultural Property. The museum collection was subsequently augmented by the founder's son, Ōkura Kishichirō.

Collection
The three National Treasures in the collection are a Heian-period wooden statue of Samantabhadra (Fugen Bosatsu in Japanese) riding on an elephant; a scroll painting Imperial Guard Cavalry ( in Japanese) dating to 1247; and a copy of the preface to the Kokinshū attributed to Minamoto no Shunrai. Losses in the 1923 earthquake include one of the dry lacquer statue group of the Ten Great Disciples of which six survive at Kōfuku-ji (National Treasures).

See also

 List of National Treasures of Japan (paintings)
 List of National Treasures of Japan (sculptures)
 List of National Treasures of Japan (writings: Japanese books)
 List of Important Cultural Properties of Japan (Shōwa period: structures)

References

External links
 Homepage
  Homepage

Art museums and galleries in Tokyo
Buildings and structures in Minato, Tokyo
Art museums established in 1917
1917 establishments in Japan